Expected may refer to:
Expectation (epistemic)
Expected value
Expected shortfall
Expected utility hypothesis
Expected return
Expected loss

See also
Unexpected (disambiguation)
Expected value (disambiguation)